G. David Nordley (born 1947 in Minneapolis) is a science fiction writer, physicist, and astronautical engineering consultant whose fiction writing is most associated with Analog Science Fiction and Fact. His fiction is under the name G. David Nordley while his technical writing is written under the name Gerald D. Nordley. He is a fellow of the British Interplanetary Society and a senior member of the American Institute of Aeronautics and Astronautics. Gerald is an active participant in the Contact Conference, which is currently held every two years in Northern California.

His Into the Miranda Rift was nominated for both the Hugo Award for Best Novella and the Nebula Award for Best Novella.

Bibliography

Books

Short fiction 
Collections

Stories

Critical studies and reviews of Nordley's work

References

External links
G. David Nordley's Home Page

1947 births
Living people
American male novelists
American male short story writers
American science fiction writers
American short story writers
American Unitarian Universalists
Asimov's Science Fiction people
Writers from Minneapolis
Novelists from Minnesota